Delfí Geli i Roura (born 22 April 1969) is a Spanish former professional footballer who played as a right-back, currently president of Girona FC.

Club career
Born in Salt, Girona, Catalonia, Geli began his professional career as a forward, while playing for hometown's Girona FC and FC Barcelona (he only appeared once for the latter's first team in La Liga, in a 0–0 home draw against Real Oviedo on 31 January 1990). He reconverted to right-back at Albacete Balompié, signing with the Castile-La Mancha club in summer 1991 and playing 32 games in its first-ever season in the top division.

In 1994–95, after scoring a total of nine league goals for Albacete in his last two seasons, Geli joined Atlético Madrid. He was instrumental in the capital side's double conquest in the following campaign, playing 49 matches in all competitions and scoring twice.

After a second spell with Albacete, now in Segunda División, 31-year-old Geli moved to Deportivo Alavés in 2000, making 35 appearances in his first year as the Basques finished in tenth position. While taking part in that season's UEFA Cup final, he scored the decisive goal – an own golden goal which made the score 5–4 to opponents Liverpool.

Geli returned to his first senior club in 2003, and retired after two seasons in the Segunda División B, having amassed professional totals of 366 games and 29 goals, 343 and 23 in the top flight alone. On 9 July 2015 he was elected president of Girona, now in the second tier.

International career
Geli represented Spain on four occasions, in a one-year span. His debut came on 15 January 1992 in a friendly with Portugal, in Torres Novas.

In 1993, Geli appeared twice for the Catalonia regional team.

Honours
Atlético Madrid
La Liga: 1995–96
Copa del Rey: 1995–96

References

External links

1969 births
Living people
People from Gironès
Sportspeople from the Province of Girona
Spanish footballers
Footballers from Catalonia
Association football defenders
Association football forwards
La Liga players
Segunda División players
Segunda División B players
Tercera División players
Girona FC players
FC Barcelona Atlètic players
FC Barcelona players
Albacete Balompié players
Atlético Madrid footballers
Deportivo Alavés players
Spain international footballers
Catalonia international footballers
Spanish football chairmen and investors
Girona FC non-playing staff